The Lara Sporting Club, nicknamed the Cats, is an Australian sports club based in the city of Lara, Victoria.

The club's Australian rules football and netball teams currently compete in the Geelong Football Netball League. Lara play its home games at Lara Recreation Reserve. Other sections of the club include baseball and cricket

Lara is situated between Geelong and Werribee on the main Geelong rail line so over the years the club has played in competitions to the East and West of the town.

History
1907-1914 Geelong Football Association
1919-1927 Werribee Lara Football Association
1928-1932 Geelong Athletic Societies League
1933-1935 Geelong Football Association
1936-1946 Werribee District Football League
1947-1988 Geelong & District Football League
1989-2019 Geelong Football League

Merger

In 1975 the Football club and the cricket merged to form the Lara Sporting Club.

Geelong Football League 
After winning two premierships in three years Lara opted to move into the GFL in 1989. In 2015 the League was absorbed into the AFL Barwon Football League.

VFL / AFL players 
 Allen Christensen – , 
 Josh Walker – , 
 Michael Kol – 
 Nigel Kol – 
 Devon Smith - ,

Bibliography
 Cat Country: History of Football In The Geelong Region by John Stoward –

References

External links

 Official website

Geelong Football League clubs
1880 establishments in Australia
Geelong & District Football League clubs
Sports clubs established in 1880
Netball teams in Victoria (Australia)
Australian club cricket teams
Baseball teams in Australia